Callionymus afilum, the Northern Australian longtail dragonet, is a species of dragonet native to the Pacific Ocean around Papua New Guinea and Australia.

References 

A
Fish described in 2000
Taxa named by Ronald Fricke